Casey Neill is an American musician. He leads Portland, Oregon-based band Casey Neill & The Norway Rats, singing with a raspy vocal quality and playing electric and acoustic guitars. Neill's style, folk-punk, mixes influences from punk, Celtic and folk music, and has been compared to R.E.M. and The Pogues.

The Norway Rats have included Jenny Conlee of The Decemberists on keyboards and accordion, among other established Portland musicians Jesse Emerson, Jeff 'Chet' Lyster, Lewi Longmire, Little Sue, Hanz Araki and Ezra Holbrook of Dr. Theopolis.

History
Casey Neill was born in New Haven, Connecticut in 1971 in a hospital room with "a nurse singing Irish folk songs". His father is Peter Neill. He moved to Olympia, Washington in 1989 and graduated from the Evergreen State College with an ethnomusicology education. Neill then developed as an artist in the underground music community of the Pacific Northwest, releasing two early cassette releases and then his first CD, Rifraff, in 1995. Two songs from that album, Rifraff and Dancing on The Ruins of Multinational Corporations, became the de facto soundtracks for many Earth First! and other logging protests during the 1990s, a time of growing tension between environmentalists and the logging communities of the Pacific Northwest. Dancing on the Ruins of Multinational Corporations is still sung by protest communities around the world.

Highly regarded Scottish musician and producer Johnny Cunningham, one of Neill's early supporters, produced his albums Skree and Brooklyn Bridge. Cunningham plays fiddle on these albums plus Live on 11th Street, the last live recording of him before his untimely passing in 2003. Besides including some of his current bandmates and Johnny Cunningham, Brooklyn Bridge features cameos from Chris Funk of The Decemberists, John Wesley Harding, Erin McKeown and Phil Cunningham, Johnny's brother.

Neill has been included on numerous compilations. One tribute release, Where Have All the Flowers Gone: the Songs of Pete Seeger (Appleseed Recordings), won Top Independent Release of 1998 from the American Association of Independent Music. The compilation includes Neill alongside tracks from Bruce Springsteen and Billy Bragg, two artists to whom Neill has been compared.

Since 2012, Casey Neill has been a member of The Minus 5 playing electric guitar and backup vocals. He sings on The Minus 5 box set 'Scott the Hoople in the Dungeon of Horror' on Yep Roc records along with Ian McLagan, Jeff Tweedy, Mike Mills, Laura Gibson, and other guests.

Casey Neill is also in a Pogues tribute band called K.M.R.I.A.  The full band is: Casey Neill, Scott McCaughey, Hanz Araki, Jesse Emerson, Jenny Conlee, Chris Funk, Derek Brown, and Ezra Holbrook. They perform around St Patrick's Day and Christmas in Seattle and Portland and are "heartily endorsed" by James Fearnley of The Pogues.

In 2017, Casey Neill performed a set at the Newport Folk Festival. He was also a part of Speak Out!  - a performance of protest songs with the Berklee Gospel and Roots Choir, Billy Bragg, Jim James, Kevin Clark, Kyle Craft, Lucius, Margo Price, Nathaniel Rateliff, Nick Offerman, Preservation Hall Jazz Band, Rayland Baxter, Shakey Graves, Sharon Van Etten, Stephanie Hunt, Zach Williams and a house band made of Carl Broemel and Partick Hallahan of My Morning Jacket, Chris Funk, Jenny Conlee, John Moen, and Nate Query of The Decemberists and Casey Neill. Speak Out! was released on LP for Record Store Day 2018.

In 2018, they released their third official record as Casey Neill & The Norway Rats 'Subterrene'. All the songs were produced and co-written by their guitarist Jeff "Chet" Lyster and guests on the album include Scott McCaughey, Peter Buck of R.E.M., Dave Depper of Death Cab for Cutie, and Thayer Sarrano. Rolling Stone debuted the stop motion animation video for 'In the Swim'.

Discography
 Subterrene - Incident Recordings - January 2018
 All You Pretty Vandals - Incident Recordings - November 2013
 Good Bye to the Rank and File - In Music We Trust Records - 2010
 Brooklyn Bridge - In Music We Trust Records - 2007
 Memory Against Forgetting - Daemon Records - 2005
 Live on 11th Street - self-release - 2004
 Raleigh & Spencer 7" - Broadside Records - 2003
 Portland West - Appleseed Recordings - 2001
 Skree - Appleseed Recordings - 1999
 Casey Neill Appleseed Recordings - 1998
 Riff Raff - Mock Turtle Music - 1996 - out of print
 Pawprints (cassette-only) - 1994 - out of print
 Wooden Shoes (cassette-only) - 1993 - out of print

Compilations (Exclusive Tracks):
 KBOO Pickathon 2003 Live - on "Lucy Campbell and the Jolly Tinker" (reels) with Kevin Burke and "Chinquapin" by Casey Neill with Little Sue and Lewi Longmire. 
 Hold Me Up To The Light: A Tribute to Peter Wilde (2003) - on "Carnival" by Peter Wilde with Little Sue
 KBOO Pickathon 2001 Live - on "Kitty" by Casey Neill Trio
 Where Have All the Flowers Gone: the Songs of Pete Seeger (1999) - on "Old Father Hudson/My Dirty Stream" by Casey Neill

References

External links

 Official website
 Where Have All The Flowers Gone on Appleseed Records
 KMRIA on MySpace
 In Music We Trust
 Interview on The Wordbird Says
 Album Review for Goodbye to the Rank and File

Musicians from Portland, Oregon
Evergreen State College alumni
Folk punk musicians
Living people
Year of birth missing (living people)